Events in the year 1935 in Bulgaria.

Incumbents 
Monarch – Boris III

Events 

 April 21 – Tsar Boris banned all political parties.

References 

 
1930s in Bulgaria
Years of the 20th century in Bulgaria
Bulgaria
Bulgaria